Anemonin is a compound found in plants of the buttercup family (Ranunculaceae). It is the dimerization product of the toxin protoanemonin and easily reacts with water to a dicarboxylic acid.

The name of the substance comes from the plant genus Anemone, from which it was first identified.

Potential uses 
Antispasmodic and analgetic properties have been described.

The compound appears to inhibit pigmentation synthesis, and has therefore been suggested as a potential candidate for cosmetic use.

References 

Furanones
Spiro compounds
Ranunculaceae
Cyclobutanes